The 1980 North Carolina lieutenant gubernatorial election was held on November 4, 1980. Democratic incumbent James C. Green defeated Republican nominee Bill Cobey with 53.20% of the vote.

Primary elections
Primary elections were held on May 6, 1980.

Democratic primary

Candidates
James C. Green, incumbent Lieutenant Governor
Carl J. Stewart Jr., Speaker of the North Carolina House of Representatives
Clyde Pulley

Results

General election

Candidates
Major party candidates
James C. Green, Democratic
Bill Cobey, Republican

Other candidates
Craig Franklin, Libertarian

Results

References

1980
Gubernatorial
North Carolina